Streptomyces cyslabdanicus is a bacterium species from the genus of Streptomyces which has been isolated from soil from the Ishigaki Island in Japan. Streptomyces cyslabdanicus produces lactacystin and cyslabdan.

See also 
 List of Streptomyces species

References

External links
Type strain of Streptomyces cyslabdanicus at BacDive -  the Bacterial Diversity Metadatabase	

cyslabdanicus
Bacteria described in 2015